"Un fatto ovvio" (English: An obvious fact) is the third single released 10 April 2009 from Italian singer Laura Pausini's album, Primavera in anticipo. "Un hecho obvio" is its Spanish language adaptation. The song has peak at #14 on the Italian Singles Chart.

The piano starting playing of this song is similar of those of Piano Sonata No. 14 of Beethoven in his 1st Movement's first measures.

Track listing
Digital download
"Un fatto ovvio" – 3:08
"Un hecho obvio" – 3:08 (Spanish version)

Music video
The video is set in the city of Berlin in 2039.
The story follow a city where kissing in public is strictly forbidden by the law. But, despite these dark clouds hanging over the characters, the story has a happy ending!

Charts

Weekly charts

Year-end charts

References

2009 singles
Pop ballads
Italian-language songs
Laura Pausini songs
Songs written by Laura Pausini
2008 songs
Atlantic Records singles